Jesse Wharton (July 29, 1782July 22, 1833) was an attorney who briefly represented Tennessee in each house of Congress.

Biography
Wharton was born in Covesville, Albemarle County, Virginia; studied law at Dickinson College, was admitted to the Virginia bar, and practiced in Albemarle County. He married Mary "Polly" Philips (6 Sep 1786 - 11 Apr 1813), the daughter of Joseph Philips Jr. and Milberry Horn, on April 20, 1804, in Davidson County, Tennessee. They had five children, John Overton, Joseph Philips, Rhoda Ann, Sarah Angelina, and Mary Philips. Mary died at the age of 26. He also had five children with his second wife, his cousin, Elizabeth Auston Rice, of Virginia.

Career
After moving to Tennessee, Wharton was elected as a Democratic Republican to the Tenth Congress as Representative in the United States House of Representatives, and served from March 4, 1807 to March 3, 1809. He was appointed to the United States Senate to fill the vacancy caused by the resignation of George W. Campbell and served from March 17, 1814, to October 10, 1815,  when a successor was elected.  He then returned to his law practice. In 1832 he was named to the Board of Visitors of the United States Military Academy.

Death
Wharton died in Nashville, Tennessee on July 22, 1833, one week before his fifty first birthday. He is interred at Mount Olivet Cemetery.  His grandson, Wharton Jackson Green was a U.S. Congressman from North Carolina.

References

External links
Biographical Directory of the United States Congress
Tennessee Records - Tennessee Records and Marriage Bonds

(Some of the biographical detail in this article is derived from the public domain Biographical Directory of the United States Congress.  In turn, some of the material from that source is derived from the book Tennessee Senators as Seen by One of Their Successors by Senator Kenneth McKellar.)

1782 births
1833 deaths
United States senators from Tennessee
Democratic-Republican Party United States senators
Democratic-Republican Party members of the United States House of Representatives from Tennessee
19th-century American politicians